Blood Brothers is a 1935 German drama film directed by Johann Alexander Hübler-Kahla and starring Brigitte Horney, Carl Esmond, and Attila Hörbiger. It is set in Bosnia.

Cast

References

Bibliography

External links 
 

1935 films
1935 drama films
German drama films
1930s German-language films
Films of Nazi Germany
Films set in Bosnia and Herzegovina
Films directed by Johann Alexander Hübler-Kahla
German black-and-white films
1930s German films